Yes Tor  is the second highest point on Dartmoor, Devon, South West England, at  above sea level. It is one of only two wholly English peaks south of the Peak District National Park—the other being nearby High Willhays—that are above .

It lies within a British Army firing range and safe access is only possible on days or nights when firing is not taking place.  See the current Dartmoor Firing Notice.

Yes Tor is  lower than the nearby High Willhays.

A notable mine is located in the area.

In literature
In his memoir Father and Son (1907), Edmund Gosse views Yes Tor, near which he lived when a boy, as an unthreatening and unprepossessing hill: "Alas! We might as well have attempted to rouse the summit of Yes Tor into volcanic action."

US science fiction author Kim Stanley Robinson makes an oblique reference to Yes Tor in his novel 2312, commingled with a variety of then-historical musical contextual clues.

In popular culture
Yes Tor was the original inspiration for the name of the Yes album Tormato and a picture of the Tor features on the album cover, and a topographic map on the inner sleeve. The planned name for the album was Yes Tor until Rick Wakeman vandalised the prototype artwork using a quite ripe tomato.

References

External links

Tors of Dartmoor
Nuttalls
Dartmoor